Žipov is a village and municipality in Prešov District in the Prešov Region of eastern Slovakia.

History
In historical records the village was first mentioned in 1354.

Geography
The municipality lies at an altitude of 390 metres and covers an area of 7.641 km². It has a population of about 250 people.

References

External links
 Official village web-page

Villages and municipalities in Prešov District
Šariš